Epermenia thailandica is a moth of the family Epermeniidae. It is found in Thailand, the Russian Far East and the islands of Honshu and Kyushu in Japan.

The length of the forewings is 5.5–7 mm. The forewings are whitish-grey on the basal third of the wing, scattered with dark scales on the costal area. There is pale brownish-yellow suffusion on the apical two-thirds.

The larvae feed on the fruit of Eleutherococcus senticosus. The species overwinters in the pupal stage.

References

Moths described in 1987
Epermeniidae
Moths of Japan
Moths of Asia